Aleksandr Stepanov may refer to:
 Alexander Stepanov (ice hockey) (born 1979), Russian ice hockey player
 Aleksandr Stepanov (general) (1893–1941), Soviet general
 Aleksandr Sergeyevich Stepanov (born 1981), Russian footballer
 Aleksandr Stepanov (canoer), Kyrgyzstani canoer who participated in the 2006 Asian Games
 Alexander Stepanov (figure skater) (born 1991), Russian-Belarusian pair skater
 Aleksandr Stepanov (footballer, born 1996), Russian footballer
 Alexander Stepanov (born 1950), Russian American programmer
 Alexander Stepanov (physicist) (1908–1972), Soviet material scientist
 Oleksandr Stepanov (born 1983), Ukrainian footballer